Michel Rousseau (5 February 1936 – 23 September 2016) was a French amateur track cyclist. He won gold medals in the individual sprint at the 1956 Summer Olympics and 1956–1958 world championships, finishing second in 1959 and 1961.

His grandson Cassiel Rousseau is an Australian diver who competed at the 2020 Summer Olympics in the Men's 10 metre platform.

References

1936 births
2016 deaths
French male cyclists
Olympic cyclists of France
Olympic gold medalists for France
Cyclists at the 1956 Summer Olympics
Olympic medalists in cycling
Cyclists from Paris
Medalists at the 1956 Summer Olympics
UCI Track Cycling World Champions (men)
French track cyclists